Lamellaria cerebroides is a species of small, slug-like sea snail, a marine gastropod mollusc in the family Velutinidae.

References

 Powell A. W. B., New Zealand Mollusca, William Collins Publishers Ltd, Auckland, New Zealand 1979 
 Bruce A. Marshall, Molluscan and brachiopod taxa introduced by F. W. Hutton in The New Zealand journal of science; Journal of the Royal Society of New Zealand, Volume 25, Issue 4, 1995

Velutinidae
Gastropods of New Zealand
Gastropods described in 1883